Grevillea wilkinsonii, commonly known as the Tumut grevillea, is a shrub which is endemic to a small area of the South West Slopes, New South Wales in Australia.

G. wilkinsonii occurs in two localities; along a part of the Goobarragandra River, and near Gundagai.  

It is listed as endangered under the NSW Biodiversity Conservation Act 2016, and threatened under the Commonwealth of Australia Environment Protection and Biodiversity Conservation Act 1999. G. wilkinsonii has been the subject of a recovery plan.

References

wilkinsonii
Flora of New South Wales
Proteales of Australia
Taxa named by Robert Owen Makinson